Jeffrey Joseph Fassero (born January 5, 1963) is a former Major League Baseball pitcher.

Professional career

Montreal Expos
At 28, Fassero was somewhat old for a rookie, but pitched well for the team and eventually made it to the starting rotation by the  season. That same year he posted an impressive ERA of 2.29. He became a full-time starter during the 1994 season and had perhaps his finest year as a starter in 1996, earning 15 wins with 222 strikeouts and finishing ninth in NL Cy Young Award voting.

Seattle Mariners
On October 29, 1996 in a cost-cutting move, the Expos traded Fassero and Alex Pacheco to the Seattle Mariners in exchange for Chris Widger, Matt Wagner and Trey Moore. That season he posted a 16-9 won-loss record with a 3.61 ERA in 35 starts.

Rangers, Red Sox, Cubs, Cardinals
Fassero enjoyed some stability during his time with the Mariners, but after a mid-season trade to the Texas Rangers in  he would wind up playing on eight different teams in only seven seasons. He proved to no longer be effective as a regular starter, so he was moved into the bullpen. While with the St. Louis Cardinals, Fassero made a few starts in the  season, and would make occasional starts until the end of his career.

Colorado Rockies and Arizona Diamondbacks
Fassero said that he would not be ready in time, and was subsequently released by the Rockies due to what then-manager Clint Hurdle called "philosophical differences".

He almost immediately signed with the Arizona Diamondbacks, but he only made one appearance with the team, pitching one perfect inning in relief.

San Francisco Giants
Fassero signed with the Giants on December 15, and remained on the team until May 8, 2006 when the Giants designated Fassero for assignment. The move cleared room on the team's roster for left-handed starting pitcher Noah Lowry.

On February 9, 2007 he announced his retirement. In the winter of 2008, though, Fassero pitched with Mayos de Navojoa in Liga Mexicana del Pacífico before he finally retired for good.

Minor League coach
Fassero was hired in December 2009 as the pitching coach for the Boise Hawks, a minor league affiliate of the Chicago Cubs in the Class 'A' short-season Northwest League.

For the 2011 season, Fassero was promoted to pitching coach of the Peoria Chiefs in the Midwest League.

Jeff Fassero received a promotion to the Double-A Tennessee Smokies (Chicago Cubs) for the 2012 season.

From 2014 to 2015, Fassero was the pitching coach for the Double-A Pensacola Blue Wahoos (Cincinnati Reds).  He started the 2016 season as a roving pitching instructor for the Cincinnati Reds before being named pitching coach of the Triple-A Louisville Bats, taking over for the recently promoted Ted Power.  Fassero is the current pitching coach for the Bats.

See also
 List of Montreal Expos Opening Day starting pitchers

References

External links

1963 births
Living people
American expatriate baseball players in Canada
Arizona Diamondbacks players
Arkansas Travelers players
Baseball coaches from Illinois
Baseball players from Illinois
Boston Red Sox players
Canton-Akron Indians players
Chicago Cubs players
Colorado Rockies players
Indianapolis Indians players
Johnson City Cardinals players
Lincoln Land Loggers baseball players
Louisville Redbirds players
Major League Baseball pitchers
Mayos de Navojoa players
Minor league baseball coaches
Montreal Expos players
San Francisco Giants players
Seattle Mariners players
Sportspeople from Springfield, Illinois
Springfield Cardinals players
St. Louis Cardinals players
St. Petersburg Cardinals players
Texas Rangers players
American expatriate baseball players in Mexico